Wyzeman Marshall (Hudson, New Hampshire, September 26, 1816 – December 6, 1896) was a stage actor in New York City and Boston between the 1820s and 1870s, as well as a teacher of oration and elocution. He often shared the same stage with Edwin Booth, noted brother of assassin John Wilkes Booth.

Life and career 
In the 1850s, Wyzeman taught oratory at the Norway Liberal Institute in Massachusetts. Among his students was the famous painter, Darius Cobb.

From 1858 to 1860, he was a "Past Junior Grand Warden" with St. John's Lodge, a Freemason organization in Boston.

Sometime in the early 1860s, Marshall managed the Howard Athenaeum in Boston.

In 1863 and 1864 the Boston Theater was under the management of Wyzeman Marshall.

The Waltham Sentinel (in Waltham, Massachusetts) reported on 25 January 1867 about a Rumford Institute lecture by Marshall, "the well-known Shakesperian [sic] actor".

Between 1867 and 1874, Marshall was a regular lecturer at the Salem Lyceum where he was often on the same bill as Frederick Douglass, Ralph Waldo Emerson and Oliver Wendell Holmes, Sr.

From the Harvard News: Secure your tickets for the grand musical and literary entertainment at Union Hall, Thursday evening, Jan. 17, 1884, at Brock and Leavitt's. Talent-Germania Orchestra; Thomas Henry, cornetist; Wyzeman Marshall, elocutionist; Mrs. E. A. Taylor, soprano; Lotos Glee Club.

On 4 December 1896, the New York Times reported: "Wyzeman Marshall, the actor, Dying." He was referred to as a veteran actor and teacher of elocution.

Actors/Actresses who studied under Wyzeman Marshall 
Charlotte Blair Parker (1858–1937)

Family 
Wyzeman Marshall had a brother named Leonard who published a book in 1854, titled Hunter's Glee, dedicated to Wyzeman. Containing many references in the German language, the book included music composed by Leonard Marshall.

References 

19th-century American male actors
American male stage actors
American educators
1815 births
1895 deaths
Elocutionists